When We Break is the second release by indie-rock band Criteria. It was released August 23, 2005 on Saddle Creek Records.

The CD-release party was held in Omaha, Nebraska on August 20, 2005 at the Sokol Underground. Facing New York and local band, The Stay Awake opened the show.

This album is the 81st release of Saddle Creek Records.

Track listing
 "Prevent the World" – 2:43
 "Draped in the Blood" – 2:33
 "Good Luck" – 2:46
 "Kiss the Wake" – 3:47
 "Grey Matter" – 3:10
 "Salt in Game" – 3:41
 "Self Help" – 3:11
 "Run Together" – 3:08
 "Ride the Snake" – 3:07
 "On Time" – 2:49
 "Connections" – 5:00

Musicians/Help
Steve Pedersen - Guitar, Vocals, Recording
Aaron Druery - Guitar
AJ Mogis - Bass, Vocals, Recording, Engineering, Mixing
Mike Sweeney - Drums
Doug Van Sloun - Mastering

External links
Criteria official website
Criteria on MySpace
Saddle Creek Records

2005 albums
Criteria (band) albums
Saddle Creek Records albums